Duke of Alba de Tormes, commonly known as Duke of Alba, is a title of Spanish nobility that is accompanied by the dignity of Grandee of Spain. In 1472, the title of Count of Alba de Tormes, inherited by García Álvarez de Toledo, was elevated to the title of Duke of Alba de Tormes by King Henry IV of Castile.

History
The dukedom of Alba de Tormes is one of the most significant noble titles of Spain and gives its name to the House of Alba.

Famous holders of this dukedom include Don Fernando Álvarez de Toledo, 3rd Duke of Alba, governor of the Spanish Netherlands (references to "Alba" (or "Alva" in Dutch), particularly in the context of Dutch history, are usually about him), and Doña María del Pilar de Silva, 13th Duchess of Alba, a muse of the painter Francisco Goya.

Various dukes have married into the families of Christopher Columbus and Cosimo de Medici, as well as the line of the Dukes of Berwick, making them distant relatives of the Earls Spencer and the Dukes of Marlborough.

Today, the ducal family of Alba retains a large and valuable collection of art and historic documents. The largest part of this treasure is kept at the main residence of the family in Madrid, the Liria Palace.

Lords of Alba de Tormes (1429)
 Don Gutierre Álvarez de Toledo (also Bishop of Palencia, Archbishop of Seville, then Archbishop of Toledo)
 Don Fernando Álvarez de Toledo, nephew of Gutierre Álvarez de Toledo (created Count of Alba de Tormes in 1439)

Counts of Alba de Tormes (1439)
 Don Fernando Álvarez de Toledo, 1st Count of Alba
 Don García Álvarez de Toledo, 2nd Count of Alba (created Duke of Alba de Tormes in 1472)

Dukes of Alba de Tormes (1472)

 Don García Álvarez de Toledo, 1st Duke of Alba
 Don Fadrique Álvarez de Toledo, 2nd Duke of Alba
 Don Fernando Álvarez de Toledo, 3rd Duke of Alba known in The Netherlands as the Iron Duke for his harsh action in the Eighty Years' War
 Don Fadrique Álvarez de Toledo, 4th Duke of Alba
 Don Antonio Álvarez de Toledo, 5th Duke of Alba
 Don Fernando Álvarez de Toledo, 6th Duke of Alba
 Don Antonio Álvarez de Toledo, 7th Duke of Alba
 Don Antonio Álvarez de Toledo, 8th Duke of Alba
 Don Antonio Álvarez de Toledo, 9th Duke of Alba
 Don Francisco Álvarez de Toledo, 10th Duke of Alba
 Doña María Teresa Álvarez de Toledo, 11th Duchess of Alba
 Don Fernando de Silva, 12th Duke of Alba
 Doña María Teresa de Silva, 13th Duchess of Alba
 Don Carlos Miguel Fitz-James Stuart, 14th Duke of Alba (see also Duke of Berwick)
 Don Jacobo Fitz-James Stuart, 15th Duke of Alba
 Don Carlos María Fitz-James Stuart, 16th Duke of Alba
 Don Jacobo Fitz-James Stuart, 17th Duke of Alba
 Doña María del Rosario Cayetana Fitz-James Stuart y Silva, 18th Duchess of Alba
 Don Carlos Fitz-James Stuart, 19th Duke of Alba

References

Bibliography

External links 

 House of Alba Foundation 
 Origins of the House of Alba 

 
 
Dukedoms of Spain
Grandees of Spain
Lists of dukes
Lists of Spanish nobility
Noble titles created in 1472